= Dupadiya =

- village
- Location within Madhya Pradesh Location within India
- Coordinates: 23.4291667°N 77.3970354°E
- Country: India
- State: Madhya Pradesh
- District: Bhopal
- Tehsil: Huzur
- Elevation: 476 m (1,562 ft)

Population (2011)
  - Total: 555
- Time zone: UTC+5:30 (IST)
- ISO 3166 code: MP-IN
- 2011 census code: 482393

Dupadiya is a village in the Bhopal district of Madhya Pradesh, India. It is located in the Huzur tehsil and the Phanda block.

== Demographics ==
According to the 2011 census of India, Dupadiya has 116 households. The effective literacy rate (i.e. the literacy rate of population excluding children aged 6 and below) is 76.11%.

Demographics (2011 Census)
	Total	Male	Female
Population	555	291	264
Children aged below 6 years	82	37	45
Scheduled caste	276	138	138
Scheduled tribe	7	2	5
Literates	360	213	147
Workers (all)	152	134	18
Main workers (total)	117	109	8
Main workers: Cultivators	27	26	1
Main workers: Agricultural labourers	16	15	1
Main workers: Household industry workers	5	5	0
Main workers: Other	69	63	6
Marginal workers (total)	35	25	10
Marginal workers: Cultivators	6	3	3
Marginal workers: Agricultural labourers	21	16	5
Marginal workers: Household industry workers	0	0	0
Marginal workers: Others	8	6	2
Non-workers	403	157	246
